The Guacamayo plump toad or sapo de Guacamayo (Osornophryne guacamayo) is a species of toad in the family Bufonidae occurring in Colombia and Ecuador.

Its natural habitat is subtropical or tropical moist montane forests which is currently threatened by habitat loss.

References

Osornophryne
Amphibians of the Andes
Amphibians of Colombia
Amphibians of Ecuador
Amphibians described in 1987
Taxonomy articles created by Polbot